The Las Vegas and Tonopah Railroad was a  railroad built by William A. Clark that ran northwest from a connection with the mainline of the San Pedro, Los Angeles and Salt Lake Railroad at Las Vegas, Nevada to the gold mines at Goldfield. The SPLA&SL railroad later became part of the Union Pacific Railroad and serves as their mainline between Los Angeles and Salt Lake City.

History
In April 1905, Clark made a verbal agreement with Francis Marion Smith that Smith could build a rail line to his borax operations at Lila C connecting with the San Pedro, Los Angeles and Salt Lake Railroad at Las Vegas.  After Smith's men had already graded  for tracks, his workers received a no trespassing order that they were not allowed to connect with Clark's rail.  Clark had apparently changed his mind, and subsequently, he laid his own rail on the line graded by Smith's men.  In response, Smith started his own competing railroad, the Tonopah and Tidewater to the Goldfield boomtowns in direct competition with Clark.

The Las Vegas and Tonopah Railroad was incorporated on September 22, 1905. On March 1, 1906, the track was completed between Las Vegas and Indian Springs. By June 30, 1906, the line was over 50% completed, reaching Rose's Well. In December 1906 the tracks reached Rhyolite.  Finally, in November 1907 the entire  line was in operation between Las Vegas and Goldfield.

The northern end of the line (Beatty - Goldfield) was only in operation from 1908 - 1914.  That  of track was removed during World War I.  The Las Vegas & Tonopah continued to serve the Bullfrog Mining District at Beatty until 1917/1918. By 1919, the remaining  of track was abandoned and scrapped.

Operations

In 1906 the  trip from Las Vegas to Beatty took 6 hours.  Trains operated daily until February 1, 1917, and then became tri-weekly until abandonment.

The LV&T depot at Rhyolite still remains. It was constructed in 1909 at a cost of $130,000.

Locomotives
The railroad primarily used "Ten Wheeler" 4-6-0 and Consolidation (2-8-0) type locomotives, primarily manufactured by Brooks and Baldwin Locomotive Works. The railroad's first four locomotives were purchased in used condition.  The railroad would later purchase 12 additional new locomotives. Upon abandonment of the railroad in 1917/1918, these locomotives were sold to the Northwestern Pacific Railroad, the Los Angeles and Salt Lake Railroad and the San Diego and Arizona Railway.

When the LV&T merged with the Bullfrog Goldfield Railroad in 1914, it also acquired its 6 steam locomotives, involving two 0-6-0 switcher locomotives, two 4-6-0 passenger locomotives, and two 2-8-0 freight locomotives.

Preservation
The Los Angeles Live Steamers group owned an old wooden passenger car which they had named "Tonopah" and labeled it as an ex-Las Vegas & Tonopah car. However, it has been confirmed it was actually from the Tonopah & Tidewater Railroad, and never actually worked on the LV&T.

Route
Las Vegas (MP 0.0)
Tule
Corn Creek
Owens
Indian Springs (MP 43.0)
Charleston, possibly named after nearby Mount Charleston, 4th highest peak in Nevada.
Amargosa (MP 74.0)
Cañon
Rosewell (Rose's Well) (MP 100.0)
Chloride
Beatty MP (118.4)
Rhyolite (MP 123.4), with spur to Montgomery-Shoshone Mine.
Original
Mud Springs
Midway
Bonnie Claire
Wagner
Stonewall
Ralston, possibly named after Ralston Valley.
Red Rock
Milltown
Columbia
Goldfield (MP 196.9)

See also
Bullfrog Goldfield Railroad
Tonopah and Goldfield Railroad
Tonopah and Tidewater Railroad
List of defunct Nevada railroads

References

External links

Defunct Nevada railroads
History of Las Vegas
History of the Mojave Desert region
History of Clark County, Nevada
History of Nye County, Nevada
Amargosa Desert
Tonopah, Nevada
Predecessors of the Union Pacific Railroad
Railway companies established in 1905
Railway companies disestablished in 1918
1905 establishments in Nevada
1918 disestablishments in Nevada
Defunct companies based in Greater Los Angeles